H. erectus is Homo erectus, a species of human theorized to be the ancestor of Homo sapiens.

H. erectus may also refer to:

 Hippocampus erectus, a species of seahorse
 Hercostomus erectus, a species of the fly genus Hercostomus

See also
 Homo erectus (disambiguation)
 H. erecta (disambiguation)
 H (disambiguation)
 Erectus (disambiguation)

Taxonomy disambiguation pages